The SC Germania List is a German rugby union club from the district List of Hanover, currently playing in the Rugby-Bundesliga. Apart from rugby, the club also offers other sports like tennis, gymnastics and handball.

The club has three German rugby union championship to its name, won in 1977, 1979 and 1981.

History
Germania List was formed in 1900. The club did however not make a serious impact on national level until 1942, when it reached the final of the national championship and lost. It repeated this effort in 1949, when it made another losing finals appearance, this time against SC Neuenheim.

The club's greatest era came in the late 1970s and early 80s, when it reached and won three championship finals, in 1977, 1979 and 1981, beating the Heidelberger RK twice and the Heidelberger TV once in the final.

In recent seasons, the club was part of the Rugby-Bundesliga's North/East division until 2001, when the league was restructured to a single-division format. It won its last national men's title to date in 2000, when it took out the German cup.

Germania earned promotion back to the Rugby-Bundesliga within two seasons in 2003, after winning their division, by beating South/West champions BSC Offenbach 22-14 in the 2nd Bundesliga final. It lasted at this level for only two seasons before suffering relegation back to the second division again in 2005.

The club missed out on Bundesliga promotion in 2007 when it lost the 2nd Bundesliga final 10-52 to RK Heusenstamm. Since then, the club's performances have declined to a point where it is not a promotion contender anymore.

A league reform in 2012 allowed the club promotion to the Bundesliga as the league was expanded from ten to 24 teams. Germania finished third in their group in the 2012-13 season and qualified for the north/east division of the championship round, where it came fifth. The club was knocked out in the first round of the play-offs after losing 103–10 to RG Heidelberg.

In 2013–14 the team qualified for the championship round and the play-offs once more, losing 31–22 to TSV Handschuhsheim in the first round. In the 2014–15 season the club finished third in the north-east championship group but was knocked out of the first round of the play-offs after a 20–24 loss to TSV Handschuhsheim. In the 2015–16 season List came second in the north/east division of the Rugby-Bundesliga but lost to Heidelberger RK in the semi-finals of the play-off.

Club honours

Men
 German rugby union championship
 Champions: 1977, 1979, 1981
 Runners up: 1942, 1949
 German rugby union cup
 Winner: 1968, 1971, 1977, 1980, 2000
 2nd Rugby-Bundesliga North/East
 Champions: 2003, 2007
 Runners up: 2002, 2006

Women
 German rugby union championship
 Runners up: 2003, 2006
 German sevens championship
 Champions: 2003, 2004
 Runners up: 2006

Recent seasons
Recent seasons of the club:

Men

 Until 2001, when the single-division Bundesliga was established, the season was divided in autumn and spring, a Vorrunde and Endrunde, whereby the top teams of the Rugby-Bundesliga would play out the championship while the bottom teams together with the autumn 2nd Bundesliga champion would play for Bundesliga qualification. The remainder of the 2nd Bundesliga teams would play a spring round to determine the relegated clubs. Where two placing's are shown, the first is autumn, the second spring. In 2012 the Bundesliga was expanded from ten to 24 teams and the 2nd Bundesliga from 20 to 24  with the leagues divided into four regional divisions.

Women

Rugby internationals
The club had two players selected for the German under-18 team at the 2009 European Under-18 Rugby Union Championship, these being Fabian Tacke and Kevin Nelson. Both also played at the 2010 tournament, as did Kevin Riege from the club.

References

External links
  Official website
  Official website of the rugby department
 Germania List club info at totalrugby.de

German rugby union clubs
Rugby clubs established in 1900
Rugby union in Hanover
1900 establishments in Germany